Boldurești is a commune in Nisporeni District, Moldova. It is composed of three villages: Băcșeni, Boldurești and Chilișoaia.

Notable people
 Vladimir Bogos

References

Communes of Nisporeni District
Kishinyovsky Uyezd